Attila Marcel is a 2013 French comedy film written and directed by Sylvain Chomet.

Cast
 Guillaume Gouix as Paul
 Anne Le Ny as Madame Proust
 Bernadette Lafont as Aunt Annie
 Elsa Davoine as Young Aunt Annie
 Hélène Vincent as Aunt Anna
 Laetitia Poulalion as Young Aunt Anna
 Jean-Claude Dreyfus as M. Kruzinsky
 Luis Rego as M. Coelho

Production
The film was produced through Eurowide Film Production. The budget was 6.7 million euros. Filming took place in the Paris area from mid-July 2012 and lasted 46 days.

Release
The film premiered in the Special Presentation section at the 2013 Toronto International Film Festival. It was released in France by Pathé Distribution on 30 October 2013. It had 43,645 admissions in France.

Reception
Attila Marcel has been met with mixed critical response from the French press, with Le Parisien rating it 5/5 but the influential Cahiers du cinéma rating it 1/5. Collating press reviews French online film site Allocine reports an average press critic score of 3.2/5 within France.

Boyd van Hoeij  of The Hollywood Reporter wrote: "Both tonally and esthetically, the film's clearly a new twig on the family tree that started somewhere before Jacques Tati and branched out to include works from such noted French-language filmmakers as Jacques Demy, Jaco Van Dormael, Jean-Pierre Jeunet and Michel Gondry. With its eye-popping production and costume design; its heavily vintage-leaning musical arrangements (co-composed by Chomet); characters breaking out into song and its constant oscillation between wondrous joy and heartfelt melancholy, Marcel fits right in and should be able to drum up significant interest on home turf." Hoeij continued: "Carlos Conti's production design feels whimsical but organic and is completely in synch with Olivier Beriot's costume design. ... The score and songs (most of them explicitly composed for the film) also evoke times past."

References

External links
 

2013 films
2013 comedy films
2010s French-language films
French comedy films
Films directed by Sylvain Chomet
2010s French films